Ghanaian English is a variety of English spoken in Ghana. English is the official language of Ghana, and is used as a lingua franca throughout the country. English remains the designated language for all official and formal purposes even as there are 11 indigenous government-sponsored languages used widely throughout the country.

Demographics 
Of the more than 28 million people in Ghana, more than half of the population uses English, and most use English exclusively. Primary and secondary school classes at public schools, and schools that prepare for public certificates are taught in English only.

Phonology 
Due to Ghana's colonial history, Ghanaian English most closely resembles British English, although it is decidedly varied and deviates from the standard in many ways based on location and context.

In contrast to the twelve monophthongal vowels of Received Pronunciation, Ghanaian English has only seven, an attribute shared with other forms of African English. Ghanaian English exhibits several mergers including the fleece–kit, foot–goose, and thought–cloth mergers.

References

 

Languages of Ghana
Dialects of English